Kingdom of Sanwi is a traditional kingdom located in the south-east corner of the Republic of Ivory Coast in West Africa. It was established in about 1740 by Anyi migrants from Ghana. In 1843 the kingdom became a protectorate of France. In 1959 it was merged with Ivory Coast and at that time the tribal population was estimated to be around 40,000 people in 119 settlements.

History 
The original country of these people is in Ghana, where the conflicts between Opoku Warreh (Axanthi) and them (Anyi) made them go to Ivory Coast.  Amalaman Anoh, first king of the Kingdom of Sanwi, led the anyi to settle in Diby in the region of Aboisso.  A leadership war then arose between the agui and the waters, the first occupants of the place.  After his victory, the anyi settled in the region of 'Ciman', a valley crowned by hills.  So that in time of war, the enemy cannot reach the place.  Aim always in search of new lands, Aka Essoin, the henchman of the remarkable and powerful King Amalaman Anoh, responsible for the expansion of the kingdom, hand in the conquest of new lands more suitable.  Krindjabo, the capital of the Sanwi kingdom is well founded, before the arrival of the white man.  Côte d'Ivoire: Sanui Aboisso is the birthplace of the oldest and most powerful kingdom in the history of Côte d'Ivoire.  The first task Nationwide agui Involves 2 voyage (Mission Treich Laplène (1887-1889) resulted in Thurs Treaties with Sanwi to Krindjabo (Aboisso) with Bettie and Indenie (Abengourou). In the North, treaties were signed with Bonducu of the Empire of Congue and Dabacala de Louis-Gustave Binger in 1889.

Kings and Chiefs 
Zena: Reigned around 1687 and made contact with the Guinea Company.

Akasini: Successor of Zena, reigns around 1700, during the return of Louis Aniaba to Assinie.

Amalaman Anoh: After the foundation of Krindjabo, Amalaman Anoh ruled the throne for a long time. He died on the throne. After him, Amondouffou Kpangni (the great) replaced him. Then he died too, giving way to Amondouffou Koutoua (the child) or Amondouffou II.  In the constitution of the Sanwi kingdom, the king reigns for life. But in case of mismanagement, he can be dismissed.

Amon N'Douffou II: It was during the reign of Amondouffou that the first Europeans arrived in Ivory Coast. He is the first king to sign a treaty with them and established the current organization of the Sanwi Kingdom.  Under his reign, Queen Mother Malan Alloua refused to allow whites to settle in Krindjabo.  Because she found them pale and couldn't live with them. She showed them a place full of stones, Ebouesso (in stone), a name that after being corrupted resulted in the current city of Aboisso.

Kodja Assi Reis, Kodjo Adou, Amon Koutoua and Koua Malan: Kodja Assi was the first of the deposed kings of the Sanwi Kingdom.  He was dismissed for mismanagement.  His successor, Kodjo Adou, ruled for six years, before experiencing the same fate as his predecessor.  During the reign of King Amon Koutoua, there was also a problem of mismanagement forcing the king to abdicate.  After the office had been vacant for ten years, in fact, the one who had been chosen had not been accepted by the people.  He was the son of the former and as he was literate he was responsible before his father's removal to interpret messages from whites to kings. But, not being fluent in the French language, he did not faithfully translate the messages.  This earned him a categorical refusal to the throne, which he was promoted to. After these 10 years of emptiness, Koua Malan ascended the throne.  He reigned for seven years, before being dismissed for mismanagement.

Amon N'Douffou III: After the series of deposed kings, Kakou Andoh came to the throne.  He took the regnal name of Amondouffou III.  He was considered a very good king, he reigned for a long time.  According to various testimonies, he had the longest reign in the history of the Sanwi Kingdom.

Amon N'Douffou IV: With the death of Amondouffou III, Kassy Anzian Paul went to the throne.  He reigned from 1985 to 2002. A long-challenged king, he had been rejected by the late President Félix Houphouet-Boigny, who doubted his morality and origins.  It is later that this former captain of civil aviation will be revealed to the general public.  It was said of him that he was a bad king, as he took all his wealth to Ghana, where he would be from.  Added to that, the failure to comply with the laws he had created.  After 17 years of reigning over the Sanwi people, Amondufu IV's resignation was imminent and without appeal.  The impeachment, which had been premeditated twice, without success, ended up becoming a reality, one night in August 2002. The king had abdicated.

Amon N'Douffou V: resident and businessman Enan Eboua Kutwa Francis became Amon N'douffou V after the events of August 2002 (the dramatic abdication of Amondouffou IV).  In the Sanwi Kingdom, successors to the throne should not be near the kingdom.  So, his position as the "prodigal son" and, moreover, of the lineage of Kings, convinced the keepers of tradition, of his choice for the holy throne.  Thus, he was made King of Sanwi by an enthronement that lasted three days (5th, 6th and 7th of August 2005), as required by tradition.

Michael Jackson's Coronation 
The kingdom received much attention after declaring American singer Michael Jackson to be Prince of the Sanwi in 1992. Reciprocal visits by Michael Jackson and King Amon N'Douffou IV were made to Krindjabo and Los Angeles respectively. After Jackson's death in 2009, an elaborate two-day funeral was held in Sanwi. Jesse Jackson (no relation) was declared prince in August of that year when he was crowned Prince Nana by Amon N'Douffou V, Amon N'Douffou IV's successor as king of Sanwi.
Michael Joseph Jackson Jr., the eldest child of Michael Jackson was inaugurated via state visit by Amon N'Douffou IV as Prince Mikaeel Amalaman Anoh II Of the Ivory Coast Kingdom Krinjabo & Agni Empire on February 16, 1997. He was sworn in as the new health and well-being advisor and the new peace, youth and cultural ambassador of the Agni Empire by King Amon N'Douffou V on February 16, 2013- Prince Mikaeel II Of Krinjabo, King Sani II of Sanwi, Senegal, Africa.

Geography 
The Kingdom of Sanwi practically coexists with the provincial region of Sud-Comoé in Ivory Coast, but while the royal capital is located in Krindjabo, the provincial capital is located in Aboisso.  The kingdom is part of a geographic space of 6,500 square kilometers, 1/7 of which are lakes and rivers. The Sanwi Kingdom is presented as a set of hills and valleys, subdivided into three specific areas: a coastal area, sandy and made of mangroves: it covers the municipalities of Adjouan, in the south of the canton Affema; a forested area from east to west and north. Kingdom of Sanwi has one of the highest rainfall in Côte d'Ivoire, with annual rainfall exceeding 1,600 mm.  This geographical feature has greatly favored the exceptional development of industrial crops (rubber, coffee, cocoa, banana, palm oil, pineapple, etc.) and food (rice, taro, banana, banana, manioc, etc.).

Economy 
From an economic point of view, it is the agro-industrial activities that surpass it by far, in fact, it is known for its palm oil production (about 20% of national production).

References

External links
 European Delegation of Sanwi Kingdom.

1959 disestablishments in Ivory Coast